James Green (born July 8, 1960) is an American basketball coach.  He is the head men's basketball coach at Meridian Community College in Meridian, Mississippi, a position he has held since 2016. Green served as head men's basketball coach at the University of Southern Mississippi from 1996 to 2004, Mississippi Valley State University from 2005 to 2008, and Jacksonville State University from 2008 to 2016.

College coaching career
Green has held posts as assistant coach at the University of Idaho, Texas A&M University-College Station, University of Alabama and Iowa State University. In 1996, he moved on to the poisiton of head coach at The University of Southern Mississippi and later Mississippi Valley State University.

Jacksonville State
Green interviewed for the head coaching vacancy left by the non-renewal of head coach, Mike LaPlante, on April 18, 2008 in Jacksonville, Alabama. He took over the Jacksonville State Gamecocks men's basketball program, which that had lost 20 or more games in three of the previous four seasons and expected to take a slight hit due to scholarship reduction because of APR Standards not being met. Green was the first black head coach of a major sport at Jacksonville State University.

Head coaching record

College

References

External links
 Jacksonville State profile

1960 births
Living people
African-American basketball coaches
Alabama Crimson Tide men's basketball coaches
American men's basketball coaches
College men's basketball head coaches in the United States
Idaho Vandals men's basketball coaches
Iowa State Cyclones men's basketball coaches
Jacksonville State Gamecocks men's basketball coaches
Junior college men's basketball coaches in the United States
Mississippi Valley State Delta Devils basketball coaches
Ole Miss Rebels men's basketball players
Southern Miss Golden Eagles basketball coaches
Texas A&M Aggies men's basketball coaches
American men's basketball players
21st-century African-American people
20th-century African-American sportspeople